GVF may refer to:

 Greta Van Fleet, an American rock band
 Global Village Foundation, an American charity
 Golin language, native to Papua New Guinea
 Grapevine virus F, a plant virus species in the genus Vitivirus
 Gradient vector flow, a computer vision method